In computability theory and computational complexity theory, enumeration reducibility is a method of reduction that determines if there is some effective procedure for determining enumerability between sets of natural numbers. An enumeration in the context of e-reducibility is a listing of the elements in a particular set, or collection of items, though not necessarily ordered or complete.

E-reducibility is a form of positive reducibility, meaning that only positive information is processed. Positive information denotes the logic syntax for "and" and "or". The syntax for negation, "not" is not included or used.

According to Hartley Rogers Jr., an intuitive model that can be used to explain e-reducibility is as follows:Let sets  and  be given. Consider a procedure that is determined by a finite set of instructions in the following way. A computation is begun. The computation proceeds algorithmically except that, from time to time, the computing agent may be requested to obtain an “input" integer, and, from time to time the procedure yields an “output” integer. When an input is requested, any integer, or no integer, may be supplied. The order in which the members of  appear may vary as the order of inputs varies. If such a procedure exists we say that  is enumeration reducible to .The concept of e-reducibility was first introduced by the results of John Myhill, which concluded that "a set is many-one complete if and only if it is recursively enumerable and its complement is productive". This result extends to e-reducibility as well. E-reducibility was later formally codified by Rogers and his collaborator Richard M. Friedberg in Zeitschrift für mathematische Logik und Grundlagen der Mathematik (the predecessor of Mathematical Logic Quarterly) in 1959.

Definitions 

Rogers' informal definition 
In addition to his intuitive model, Rogers also provided a concise reformulation to create an informal definition. It reads:

Thus we write:

 

which is the standard notation of enumeration reducibility.

Precise definition 
From Rogers' informal definition, a precise definition can be inferred.

For any  if there exists a computably enumerable set  such that, for all 

     

In this case, we write that

  via 

or that  (the enumeration operator) witnesses .

Properties

Equivalence 

Thus we write

 Conversely, if  but  we write

 Inversely, if  and  we write

Supremum 
This equation accounts for the lack of information with an abstract variable , which is squared due to the intersection (expressed as the  symbol; a union.) It is written as

Turing reduction 
This codes it in a positive way regardless if positive or negative information is supplied. It is formally expressed as follows:
   
  is computably enumerable if and only if

Variants

Strong enumeration reducibilities 
In addition to e-reducibility, there exist strong versions, the most important one being s-reducibility (named after Robert M. Solovay). This method shows similarity to e-reducibility in that it compares the elements of multiple sets. In addition, the structure of s-degrees have natural analogs in the enumeration degrees.

The reasoning for using s-reducibility is summarized by Omandaze and Sorbi as a result of positive reducibility models being unable to answer certain oracle questions (e.g. an answer to "Is ?" is only given if , and is not true for the inverse.) because they inherently model computational situations where incomplete oracle information is available. This is in contrast from the well-studied Turing reducibility, in which information is captured in both negative and positive values. In addition, T-reducibility uses information that is provided immediately and without delay. A strong reducibility is utilized in order to prevent problems occurring when incomplete information is supplied.

Partial functions 
E-reducibility can be defined for partial functions as well. Writing graph   , etc., we can define for partial functions :

  graph graph

Kleene's recursion theorem introduces the notion of relative partial recursiveness, which, by means of systems of equations, can demonstrate equivalence through  between graphs of partial functions. E-reducibility relates to relative partial recursiveness in the same way that T-reducibility relates to μ-recursiveness.

See also 

 Turing reduction
 Many-one reduction
 Truth-table reduction
 Arithmetical hierarchy

References

Further reading 
Introduction to Metamathematics

"Theory of Recursive Functions and Effective Computability"

Enumeration Reducibility and Polynomial Time
Reduction (complexity)
Computability theory
Mathematical logic